Ilsebill may refer to:

 An opera by Friedrich Klose
 919 Ilsebill, an asteroid